Langtry is an English surname of habitational origin which derives from three settlements in Devon, Oxfordshire, and Lancashire called Langtree, from the Old English lang, long ‘long’, ‘tall’ + treow ‘tree’. 

Notable Langtrys include:
 Albert P. Langtry (1860–1939), Secretary of the Commonwealth of Massachusetts, U.S.A.
 Brian Langtry (born 1976), lacrosse player for the Colorado Mammoth and the Denver Outlaws
 Henry Langtry (1841–1892), English cavalry colonel
 Henry V.M. Langtry (1869–1935), British Army lieutenant-colonel
 James I. Langtry (1939–2021), government official and educator
 James MacKay Langtry (1894–1971), British footballer and technical adviser on shipbuilding
 John Langtry (1834–1906), M.A., D.C.L., member of the Anglican Church in Canada
 Joe Langtry (1880–1951), Australian politician
 Joseph Langtry (1805–1862), Royal Navy captain
 Lillie Langtry (1853–1929), born Emilie Charlotte Le Breton, renowned British actress
 Jeanne Marie Langtry Malcolm (1881–1964), illegitimate daughter of Lillie Langtry
 Roberta Langtry (1916–2005), Canadian philanthropist

 Arthur Langtry (the Merlin), a fictional character in Jim Butcher's novel series The Dresden Files

References

See also
Langtry (disambiguation)

English toponymic surnames